Snelston is a civil parish in the Derbyshire Dales district of Derbyshire, England.  The parish contains 21 listed buildings that are recorded in the National Heritage List for England.  Of these, one is listed at Grade II*, the middle of the three grades, and the others are at Grade II, the lowest grade.  The parish contains the village of Snelston and the surrounding countryside. The major building in the parish was the original Snelston Hall, which has been largely demolished.  The remains of the hall are listed, together with associated structures, including the stable block that has been converted into the present Snelston Hall.  The other listed buildings are a church, houses, farmhouses and cottages, a war memorial and a telephone kiosk.


Key

Buildings

References

Citations

Sources

 

Lists of listed buildings in Derbyshire